The 2012 Canada Open Grand Prix was the eighth grand prix gold and grand prix tournament of the 2012 BWF Grand Prix Gold and Grand Prix. The tournament was held in Richmond Olympic Oval, Richmond, British Columbia, Canada July 10 until July 15, 2012 and had a total purse of $50,000.

Men's singles

Seeds

  Henri Hurskainen (semi-final)
  Chou Tien-chen (champion)
  Chetan Anand (quarter-final)
  Arvind Bhat (semi-final)
  Joachim Persson (withdrew)
  Sattawat Pongnairat (quarter-final)
  Kazumasa Sakai (quarter-final)
  Rune Ulsing (second round)

Finals

Top half

Section 1

Section 2

Section 3

Section 4

Bottom half

Section 5

Section 6

Section 7

Section 8

Women's singles

Seeds

  Michelle Li (semi-final)
  Pai Hsiao-ma (second round)
  Neslihan Yigit (withdrew)
  Michelle Chan Ky (second round)

Finals

Top half

Section 1

Section 2

Bottom half

Section 3

Section 4

Men's doubles

Seeds

  Juergen Koch / Peter Zauner (semi-final)
  Phillip Chew / Sattawat Pongnairat (quarter-final)
  Takeshi Kamura / Keigo Sonoda (champion)
  Hiroyuki Saeki / Ryota Taohata (final)

Finals

Top half

Section 1

Section 2

Bottom half

Section 3

Section 4

Women's doubles

Seeds

  Misaki Matsutomo / Ayaka Takahashi (champion)
  Alex Bruce / Michelle Li (quarter-final)

Finals

Top half

Bottom half

Mixed doubles

Seeds

  Toby Ng / Grace Gao (semi-final)
  Roman Zirnwald / Elisabeth Baldauf (second round)
  Lee Hock Lai / Priscilla Lun (quarter-final)
  Takeshi Kamura / Koharu Yonemoto (final)

Finals

Top half

Section 1

Section 2

Bottom half

Section 3

Section 4

References

Canadian Open (badminton)
Canada Open Grand Prix
Canada Open Grand Prix
Canada Open Grand Prix
Canada Open Grand Prix
Sports competitions in British Columbia
BWF Grand Prix Gold and Grand Prix